The Villela Alagoas was a Brazilian single-engine, biplane, tandem-seat experimental aircraft.

Design and development
It had a metal and wooden frame, wooden wings of painted outer cover.

Specifications

References

External links
 Photo of the Villela Alagoas

1910s Brazilian experimental aircraft
Single-engined tractor aircraft
Monoplanes
Aircraft first flown in 1918